Cecidophyes is a genus of mites in the family Eriophyidae. It is a plant parasite, causing galls or other damage to the plant tissues.

Species

 Cecidophyes borealis
 Cecidophyes caliquerci
 Cecidophyes calvus
 Cecidophyes campestris
 Cecidophyes cerriquerci
 Cecidophyes galii
 Cecidophyes geranii
 Cecidophyes gibsoni
 Cecidophyes glaber
 Cecidophyes gymnaspis
 Cecidophyes lauri
 Cecidophyes malifoliae
 Cecidophyes monspessulani
 Cecidophyes nudus
 Cecidophyes potentillae
 Cecidophyes psilocranus
 Cecidophyes psilonotus
 Cecidophyes quercialbae
 Cecidophyes querciphagus
 Cecidophyes reticulatus
 Cecidophyes rouhollahi, found on Galium aparine
 Cecidophyes rumicis
 Cecidophyes tristernalis
 Cecidophyes violae

References

External links
 Cecidophyes at faunaeur.org

Eriophyidae
Trombidiformes genera